Jaine Fenn is a British science fiction author.

Fenn is the author of the Hidden Empire and Shadowlands series of novels. She studied linguistics and astronomy at the University of Hertfordshire, where she became the president of PSiFA (the local student Science Fiction society) from 1985-1986. She also helped organised Shoestringcons and edited their newsletter/fanzine, Hypo-Space, for a period.

Career
Fenn has had numerous short stories published in various magazines and anthologies, and has won the BSFA Award for Shorter Fiction. Her debut novel, Principles of Angels was  published in June 2008 (United Kingdom) and is the first of the Hidden Empire series. Her second novel, Consorts of Heaven, published in June 2009, mixed elements of fantasy with science fiction and was not a direct sequel. The third book, Guardians of Paradise (2010) brings together threads from the first two and the fourth and fifth, Bringer of Light (2011) and Queen of Nowhere (2013) take the story in a new direction. In 2012, Fenn published the short story collection Downside Girls. It features interlinked stories set in the universe of her Hidden Empire series.

Her science fantasy duology, Shadowlands, set on a divided world, starts with Hidden Sun (2018) and concludes with Broken Shadow (2019). She has also written for video-games in the Halo and Total War franchises.

Jaine Fenn has been guest of honour at 
 Picocon 34 in February 2017
 Satellite 5 in May 2016
 BristolCon in September 2015
 Andromeda One in September 2013
 Novacon 42 in November 2012
 Picocon 27 in February 2009

Works
Downside Girls (short fiction collection, 2012)
The Martian Job (novella, 2017)
Hidden Empire series
Principles of Angels (2008)
Consorts of Heaven (2009)
Guardians of Paradise (2010)
Bringer of Light (2011)
Queen of Nowhere (2013)
Shadowlands series
Hidden Sun (2018)
Broken Shadow (2019)

References

External links
 Jaine Fenn's Blog
 Times review of Principles of Angels 1 August 2008

 Downside Girls Review
 Story Behind Queen of Nowhere — Online Essay by Jaine Fenn

Year of birth missing (living people)
Living people
British science fiction writers
Alumni of the University of Hertfordshire
Women science fiction and fantasy writers
British women short story writers
British women novelists
21st-century British novelists
21st-century British women writers
21st-century British short story writers